The Great American Songbook is the loosely defined canon of significant early-20th-century American jazz standards, popular songs, and show tunes.

Definition

According to the Great American Songbook Foundation: The "Great American Songbook" is the canon of the most important and influential American popular songs and jazz standards from the early 20th century that have stood the test of time in their life and legacy. Often referred to as "American Standards", the songs published during the Golden Age of this genre include those popular and enduring tunes from the 1920s to the 1950s that were created for Broadway theatre, musical theatre, and Hollywood musical film.

Culture writer Martin Chilton defines the term "Great American Songbook" as follows: "Tunes of Broadway musical theatre, Hollywood movie musicals and Tin Pan Alley (the hub of songwriting that was the music publishers' row on New York's West 28th Street)". Chilton adds that these songs "became the core repertoire of jazz musicians" during the period that "stretched roughly from 1920 to 1960".

Although several collections of music have been published under the "Great American Songbook" title, the term does not refer to any actual book or specific list of songs. The Great American Songbook includes standards by Irving Berlin, George Gershwin, Cole Porter, Jerome Kern, Harold Arlen, Johnny Mercer, Hoagy Carmichael,  Richard Rodgers, and Oscar Hammerstein II, among others.

In Alec Wilder's 1972 study, American Popular Song: The Great Innovators, 1900–1950, the songwriter and critic lists and ranks the artists he believes belong to the Great American Songbook canon. A composer, Wilder emphasized analysis of composers and their creative efforts in this work.

Radio personality Jonathan Schwartz and singer Tony Bennett, both Songbook devotees, have both described this genre as "America's classical music".

List of songs

Revivals
In 1970, rock musician Ringo Starr surprised the public by releasing an album of Songbook songs from the 1920s, 1930s, and 1940s, Sentimental Journey. Reviews were mostly poor or even disdainful, but the album reached number 22 on the US Billboard 200 and number 7 in the UK Albums Chart, with sales of 500,000.

Other pop singers who established themselves in the 1960s or later followed with albums reviving songs from the Great American Songbook, beginning with Harry Nilsson in 1973 and continuing into the 21st century. Linda Ronstadt, Rod Stewart, and Bob Dylan made several such albums. Of Ronstadt's 1983 album, What's New, her first in a trilogy of standards albums recorded with arranger/conductor Nelson Riddle, Stephen Holden of The New York Times wrote:

See also
 Great American Songbook Foundation
 Lounge music
 Show tunes
 Tin Pan Alley
 Traditional pop music

Notes

References

Further reading

External links
 Martini in the Morning radio program featuring the Great American Songbook
 PBS Special on the Great American Songbook
 Popular Songwriters and The Great American Songbook
 The American Songbook Preservation Society
 The Great American Songbook Foundation
 The Society for the Preservation of the Great American Songbook

 
Jazz standards
1920s in American music
1930s in American music
1940s in American music
1950s in American music
1960s in American music
Nostalgia in the United States